Manolis Apostolidis (born 17 December 1983) is a Greek former professional footballer who played as a goalkeeper.

Career
Apostolidis comes from Kavala, and has started his professional career in his hometown team AOK. He has also played for Panthrakikos, Thermaikos, and for the Thessalian club Niki Volos. He signed for AEL on 22 June 2014.

External links
 Crimson Scorer (Greek)
 OnSports Profile (Greek)
 Myplayer Profile (Greek)
 Arena Larissa Interview (Greek)
 YouTube Video 
 FL News Video (Amazing save Vs Agrotikos Asteras)

1983 births
Living people
Greek footballers
Association football goalkeepers
Kavala F.C. players
Panthrakikos F.C. players
Athlitiki Enosi Larissa F.C. players
Trikala F.C. players
Footballers from Kavala